Santhi Nivasam is a 1986 Indian Telugu-language drama film produced by Angara Satyam for Rajalakshmi Movies, directed by Gullapalli Ram Mohan Rao starring Krishna, Suhasini, Radhika Sarathkumar and Kaikala Satyanarayana. Chakravarthi scored and composed the film's soundtrack. The film was declared a flop at the box office.

Cast 
 Krishna as Ravi
 Suhasini
 Radhika Sarathkumar
 Satyanarayana Kaikala
 Nutan Prasad
 Jayanthi
 Kota Srinivasa Rao
 Banerjee
 Potti Prasad
 Sakshi Ranga Rao
 Sutti Veerabhadra Rao
 Vallam Narasimha Rao
 Kantha Rao(Guest)
 Gummadi(Guest)

Songs 
Chakravarthi scored and composed the film's soundtrack with Veturi Sundararama Murthy writing the lyrics.
 "Puvvula" -
 "Podduna Gullo" -
 "Tholinati Ratri" -
 "Thummeda" -
 "Chilakamma" -

References

External links 
 Santhi Nivasam on Twitter

1986 films
1980s Telugu-language films
Indian drama films